Relax is the fifth studio album by Trance duo Blank & Jones. It was released in 2003.

Track listing
"Breezin'" – 3:26
"Unknown Treasure" – feat. Claudia Brücken - 5:49
"Beyond Time" – 5:23
"Love Comes Quickly" - by Pet Shop Boys (Ambient Remix) – 5:06
"Watching the Waves" – 5:39
"Flaming June" – feat. Elles - 3:40
"Relax" – 8:12
"Angel" – by Sarah McLachlan - 4:14
"Counting Clouds" – 4:29
"Desire" – 4:32
"Secrets & Lies" – 5:14
"Daydreamin'" – 6:17
"The Hardest Heart" – feat. Anne Clark - 4:35
"Driftin'" – 2:00

Relax (2007 Reissue) Soundcolors #SC101, Double CD, Limited Edition, released in 2007.

Track listing
CD1 - Sun
"Breezin'" – 3:26
"Unknown Treasure" – feat. Claudia Brücken - 5:49
"Beyond Time" – 5:23
"Love Comes Quickly" - by Pet Shop Boys (Ambient Remix) – 5:06
"Watching the Waves" – 5:39
"Flaming June" – feat. Elles - 3:40
"Relax" – 8:12
"Angel" – by Sarah McLachlan - 4:14
"Counting Clouds" – 4:29
"Desire" – 8:03 (mix title not given, different than one on original printing)
"Secrets & Lies" – 9:26 (mix title not given, different than one on original printing)
"Daydreamin'" – 6:17
"The Hardest Heart" – feat. Anne Clark - 4:35
"Driftin'" – 2:00

CD2 - Moon
"Relax (Vargo Vocal Mix)" – 6:04
"Breezin' (Bruno From Ibiza Mix)" – 6:20
"Flaming June (Chicane Remix)" – feat. Elles - 7:15
"Daydreamin' (Beach House Remix)" - 7:45
"Unknown Treasure (Jean F. Cochois' Timewriter Remix)" feat. Claudia Brücken - 6:16
"Driftin' (Chill & Grill Mix)" – 6:15
"Counting Clouds (Saints & Sinners Remix)" – 6:54
"Watching The Waves (Van Bellen Remix)" – 8:37
"Secrets & Lies (Solid Sessions Remix)" – 6:50
"Counting Clouds (Sunset Session Remix)" – 4:35
"Horizon" – 2:31

Blank & Jones albums
2003 albums